Female beard may refer to:

Bearded lady
Beard (companion)
Hirsutism